Luke James Hannant (born 4 November 1993) is an English professional footballer who plays as a midfielder for  club Dundee, on loan from  club Colchester United.

He spent his youth with Norwich City and Cambridge United, before embarking on a degree at Northumbria University. During his time as a student he played non-league football for Dereham Town and Team Northumbria. He helped Dareham to win the Eastern Counties League Premier Division championship title in 2012–13. He joined Gateshead in 2016, and after returning from a dual registration spell at South Shields managed to established himself in the first-team. He was signed by Port Vale in January 2018, before he made a return to Cambridge United in May 2019 and helped the club to win promotion out of League Two at the end of the 2020–21 season. He remained in League Two however, as he left Cambridge to join Colchester United. He joined Scottish Championship club Dundee on loan in January 2023.

Career

Early career
Hannant spent his youth at the Academy at Norwich City before being released at the age of 14, at which point he joined the Cambridge United youth-team. Released by Cambridge at the age of 18, he took up a football scholarship at Northumbria University, and would go on to graduate with a 2:1 degree in Sport & Exercise Science in 2016. During this time he also played in the Eastern Counties League and Isthmian League for Dereham Town and in the Northern League for Team Northumbria. He was an important part of the "Magpies" side that finished the 2012–13 season as champions of the Eastern Counties League Premier Division.

Gateshead
He spent the summer of 2016 on trial at Gateshead before agreeing to join the club on non-contract terms. He went on to join Northern League Division One club South Shields on a dual registration deal. He scored on his debut for the "Mariners" in a 5–0 home win over Jarrow Roofing Boldon Community Association on 27 September. He played a total of four games for South Shields. He made his National League debut for the "Tynesiders" on 22 October, in a 2–0 win at Maidstone United. He scored his first goal for the "Heed" on New Year's Eve, in a 4–1 victory over Barrow at the Gateshead International Stadium, where he was also named as Man of the Match. He was signed to a contract at Gateshead in March 2017, which would keep him tied to the club in summer 2018. He ended the 2016–17 season with two goals in 21 appearances, and scored three goals in 23 games in the first half of the 2017–18 campaign. Speaking in January 2018, manager Steve Watson said that "Hannant has been one of our best players this season".

Port Vale
On 18 January 2018, Hannant signed an 18-month contract with EFL League Two side Port Vale after being signed for an undisclosed fee – reported to be a low five-figure sum – by Neil Aspin, his former manager at Gateshead. Despite being a newcomer to the English Football League, he was described as "a rare positive for the Valiants in a difficult start to 2018", and credited his good start to his career to the support of fellow midfielders Michael Tonge, Antony Kay and Danny Pugh. On 17 March, he scored his first goal in the Football League with curling effort from outside the box in a 2–2 draw with Stevenage at Vale Park; he went on to say that "I was a bit speechless when it went in".

He began the 2018–19 season in good form on the left-side of midfield, scoring two goals in the opening five games, including a brilliant curling free-kick away at Carlisle United. This led to reports that he was being monitored by EFL Championship club Bolton Wanderers. However, despite making 50 appearances during the campaign, manager John Askey confirmed that he would not be offering Hannant a new contract on 16 May.

Cambridge United
On 28 May 2019, Hannant returned to Cambridge United to sign on a two-year deal with an option for a further year. Manager Colin Calderwood said that "Luke has good experience in senior football and caught my eye against us at the Abbey". He picked up an ankle injury in February 2020 and was sidelined for six weeks. However the COVID-19 pandemic in England meant that he had to wait until August to complete a full day's training with the club.

He enjoyed a strong first half to the 2020–21 season, playing on both wings and either side of a midfield diamond, providing eight assists and scoring five goals by February. Cambridge went on to secure promotion at the end of the season, with Hannant scoring seven goals from 48 appearances.

Colchester United
Hannant opted to leave Cambridge after failing to reach an agreement on a new contract and chose to remain in League Two, joining Colchester United on a two-year deal on 10 June 2021. Hannant stated that "I'm 27 now and I needed to go somewhere where I know I'm going to play a lot of minutes". He made his debut at the Colchester Community Stadium on 14 August 2021, coming on as a substitute in Colchester's 1–0 defeat to Northampton Town. He was a regular first-team player under Hayden Mullins, before being sidelined by interim head coach Wayne Brown. He made 27 starts and 16 substitute appearances in the 2021–22 season, picking up two assists and five yellow cards. He featured in 29 matches during the first half of the 2022–23 campaign, scoring three goals.

Dundee (loan) 
On 31 January 2023, Hannant joined Scottish Championship club Dundee on loan until the end of the 2022–23 season. He joined Colchester teammate Ryan Clampin, who was already on loan at Dundee. Hannant made his debut as a substitute on 12 February in a 3–0 league victory over Cove Rangers.

Style of play
Hannant is a versatile two-footed attacking midfielder, who is able to play in central midfield or as a winger. Port Vale teammate Tom Pope described him as a player with "good energy, is positive, doesn't mind a tackle, is decent in the air and can play as well".

Career statistics

Honours
Dereham Town
Eastern Counties Football League Premier Division: 2012–13

Cambridge United
League Two second-place promotion: 2020–21

References

1993 births
Living people
English footballers
Association football midfielders
Norwich City F.C. players
Cambridge United F.C. players
Dereham Town F.C. players
Team Northumbria F.C. players
South Shields F.C. (1974) players
Gateshead F.C. players
Port Vale F.C. players
Colchester United F.C. players
Dundee F.C. players
Eastern Counties Football League players
Isthmian League players
Northern Football League players
National League (English football) players
English Football League players
Scottish Professional Football League players
Alumni of Northumbria University